Jalan Maharani (Jawi: جالن مهاراني) is a major road in Bandar Maharani a royal town in Muar, Johor, Malaysia. The name was present to Maharani Fatimah, a consort to Maharaja Abu Bakar in conjunction with the opening of the Bandar Maharani in 1884.

Attractions

Landmarks
 Muar Trade Centre
 Hentian Maharani and Tangga Batu
 Muar Municipal Council or Majlis Perbandaran Muar (MPMuar) Headquarters
 Royal Malaysian Customs Muar Office
 Bandar Maharani Ferry Terminal
 Laman Maharani 
 Sultan Ismail Bridge
 Padang Nyiru and Muar Clock Tower

Maharani Uptown
Located at Jalan Sisi.

List of junctions along the road

Roads in Muar